Bihar competed in the Ranji Trophy from 1936-37 until 2003-04, after which it was succeeded by the bihar 2017-18 cricket team. Bihar has played 236 First class matches, winning 78, losing 56 and drawing 102.
Again after a gap of 15 years Bihar is playing in Ranji Trophy in 2018-19.

Ranji Trophy Record
Bihar played their first Ranji Trophy in 1936-37 domestic cricket season. The last time Bihar played in Ranji Trophy in 2003-04 domestic cricket season. Again Bihar made comeback in Ranji Trophy in 2018-19 domestic cricket season after a gap of 14 years.

White: Group/Round-Robin Stage

References

Ranji Trophy